Sir Jeremy Mirth Sullivan  (born 17 September 1945) became a Lord Justice of Appeal in January 2009 and was appointed Senior President of Tribunals in 2012. He retired from both positions on 17 September 2015. On 25 October 2016 the Transport Secretary announced that Sullivan would oversee the consultation which will follow his announcement recommending a third runway at Heathrow.

He was educated at Framlingham College and King's College London (LLB, LLM) and was called to the Bar at Inner Temple in 1968 where he became a bencher in 1993.

By 1976 Sullivan was Counsel for the Department of Environment's M25 motorway public inquiry Other clients he represented included the London Borough Councils of Hammersmith and Haringey as well as the Attorney General; while he has worked closely with Harry Woolf in matters of Planning Law. By 1979 his Court of Appeal work included advocating the legalizing of uncompleted development work.

Sullivan was made a QC in 1982, recorder from 1989 to 1997, deputy judge of the High Court from 1993 to 1997, and judge of the High Court of Justice (Queen's Bench Division) 1997–2009. Between 1994 and 1997 he served as attorney-general to the Prince of Wales.

As a judge, Sullivan presided over the 2006 Afghan hijackers case, ruling that it was unlawful under the 1971 Immigration Act to restrict the Highjackers' leave to remain in the United Kingdom, and ordered that they be granted "discretionary leave to remain", which entitled them to work in the United Kingdom.

His rulings include the February 2007 judgment that the government's 2006 Energy Review had been "misleading" and "unlawful" in its handling of the UK nuclear energy debate, and a 2008 decision in favour of the Government and rejecting a judicial review which sought to reduce night flights at Heathrow.

References

1945 births
Living people
Knights Bachelor
People educated at Framlingham College
Alumni of King's College London
Members of the Privy Council of the United Kingdom
Lords Justices of Appeal
Queen's Bench Division judges
20th-century English judges
21st-century English judges